Hayley Jones is the name of:

 Hayley Jones (sprinter) (born 1988), British sprinter
 Hayley Jones (cyclist) (born 1995), Welsh racing cyclist

See also
Haley Jones (born 2001), American basketball player